Hafiz Mohamad Ibrahim, also spelled as Hafiz Muhammad Ibrahim (1889-1968), was a leader of Indian National Congress. He was governor of Punjab, India in 1965. Ibrahim was a member of Rajya Sabha from 1958 to 1962 and served as union minister of power and irrigation. He was leader of the Rajya Sabbha from 1961 to 1963. He served as Communication and Irrigation minister for United Provinces (1937–50). محمد زمان راجڙ

Personal and Education life 
Born at Mohalla Qazi Sarai 1st in Nagina in 1888, Hafiz Ibrahim was educated at Rajkiya Diksha Vidyalaya and joined Aligarh Muslim University for higher studies.

His son Atiqur Rahman represented Nagina (Assembly constituency) 4th and 5th Legislative Assembly of Uttar Pradesh, serving from March 1967 to March 1974.

His another son Azizur Rahman (politician) was a four-time MLA, Rehman was a minister in the state four times. He represented Bijnor (Assembly constituency) 06th Legislative Assembly of Uttar Pradesh 08th Legislative Assembly of Uttar Pradesh and 09th Legislative Assembly of Uttar Pradesh In office Mar 1974 Nov 1989.

Career 
Ibrahim also was a student leader and was elected as union secretary at AMU. In 1919, he joined the independence movement. After joining Congress he was a delegate at the Nagpur convention. Later, during the 1942 movement, he was arrested and sent to Fatehgarh Jail.

After independence. Ibrahim was a member of the Rajya Sabha and became a cabinet minister in Nehru’s ministry in 1958. He held important portfolios as irrigation, waqf, PWD, food and civil supplies. During this period he was instrumental in shaping the waqf act.

Later he played important role in the Sindhu river dispute between India and Pakistan. He was also behind according university status to Roorkee Engineering College. He also organised a convention of Muslim MPs and MLAs in Lucknow. He became Governor of Punjab in 1966.

Death 
Ibrahim died during medical treatment on 24 January 1968.

References

1889 births
1968 deaths
Rajya Sabha members from Uttar Pradesh
Governors of Punjab, India
Indian National Congress politicians
Leaders of the Rajya Sabha
Recipients of the Padma Vibhushan in civil service
Ministers of Power of India